Diganta Hazarika is an Indian actor and model. He made his Bollywood debut in the epic adventure film, Mohenjo Daro (2016), directed by Ashutosh Gowariker. He also acted in Shah Rukh Khan's comeback movie Pathaan (2023). Mostly he acts in Assamese and Hindi films.

Early life
Diganta Hazarika was born on 23 September 1984 in Puranigudam, Nagaon, Assam, India.

Career
Hazarika made his acting debut in an Assamese short film, Ki Naam Di Matim. After that he acted in Assamese feature films Grahan, Rishang, Rowd and Anuradha. His latest Assamese film is Pratighaat (2019), directed by Achinta Shankar. Hazarika made his Hindi film debut in Mohenjo Daro (2016), cast as Lothar. Before this he acted in the Indian telenovela Everest, directed by Ashutosh Gowariker.

Filmography

Films

Television

References

1984 births
Assamese actors
People from Nagaon district
Living people